The Campeonato Pernambucano Série A3 was the third level of football tournaments for the Pernambucano state. It was played from 1996 to 2002.

List of Champions

Titles by team 

Teams in bold still active.

By city

See also
Campeonato Pernambucano
Campeonato Pernambucano Série A2

References

 Campeonato Pernambucano Second Level at RSSSF
 Campeonato Pernambucano Third Level at RSSSF

External links
 Pernambuco Football Federation official website